Chloe Erika Jane Olivié, known by her stage name Coucou Chloe or Coucou Chloé, is a French music producer, singer and DJ, living in London.

Biography
Olivié grew up in Biot, a village in the south of France. As a child she played a lot of piano, having been given one by her grandparents. She moved to nearby Nice to study contemporary art at Villa Arson and while there began taking her music production seriously. She left before completing the course and moved to London soon after.

Her experimental music—"austere, skeletal beats over which she often drapes her deadpan voice" and sampled animal noises—is often labelled as "deconstructed club music". She creates it with Logic Pro on a laptop, an external keyboard, and a microphone. Olivié is inspired by 1990s hip hop music, in particular Snoop Dogg.

The name Coucou Chloe "comes from a song her younger brother Leo (whose name is tattooed twice on her fingers) recorded in a card for her birthday. She'd go on to play the song at parties, and the name found a permanent home in her friends' heads". "Coucou" is a cute way of saying "hi".

Coucou Chloe is a co-founding member of music collective and record label Nuxxe (pronounced "newksie"), alongside Sega Bodega and Shygirl, both of whom she has collaborated with. She and Sega Bodega produce music as Y1640.

In October 2016, Coucou Chloe DJd her first Boiler Room set in Berlin.

She has modelled for Burberry and Vivienne Westwood fashion campaigns. Her 2016 track "Doom" was used by Rihanna for her Fenty x Puma New York Fashion Week show in 2017. "Underdog" was played during Joseph Altuzarra's 2017 Paris show. In 2020, Rihanna's Savage x Fenty fashion show premiered on Amazon Prime, again using "Doom." However Olivié and Rihanna apologised after Muslims accused the show of disrespect because "Doom" contains a recording of a hadith, or a sacred Islamic text.

Discography

Solo as Coucou Chloe
Halo (Creamcake, 2016) – EP
Erika Jane (Nuxxe, 2017) – EP
Naughty Dog (Nuxxe, 2019) – EP
"Drop Ten" (Nuxxe, 2020) – single
"Nobody" (Nuxxe, 2020) – single
One (Self-released, 2021) – EP

With Sega Bodega as Y1640
"Spit Intent" (Nuxxe, 2016) – single
"Weep" (Nuxxe, 2017) – single

References

External links

French women record producers
French record producers
French DJs
Living people
People from Alpes-Maritimes
French expatriates in England
Year of birth missing (living people)
Place of birth missing (living people)
Date of birth missing (living people)